Life's Darn Funny is a 1921 American silent comedy film directed by Dallas M. Fitzgerald and starring Viola Dana, Gareth Hughes, and Eva Gordon.

Cast
 Viola Dana as Zoe Roberts 
 Gareth Hughes as Clay Warwick 
 Eva Gordon as Miss Dellaroc 
 Kathleen O'Connor as Gwendolyn Miles 
 Mark Fenton as Prince Karamazov

References

Bibliography
 Munden, Kenneth White. The American Film Institute Catalog of Motion Pictures Produced in the United States, Part 1. University of California Press, 1997.

External links

 

1921 films
1921 comedy films
1920s English-language films
American silent feature films
Silent American comedy films
Films directed by Dallas M. Fitzgerald
American black-and-white films
Metro Pictures films
1920s American films